Casmalia (Chumash: Kasma’li, meaning "it is the last") is a census-designated place (CDP) in Santa Barbara County, California located just outside the borders of Vandenberg Air Force Base about  southwest of Santa Maria. The ZIP Code is 93429, and the community is inside area code 805. The population was 138 at the 2010 census.

History
Casmalia is located on the 1840 Mexican land grant, Rancho Casmalia.  The formal town was founded by Antonio Tognazzini in the mid-1890s and was then named Someo, after the village of origin of the Tognazzini family, Someo, Switzerland. When the post office was opened, however, it was named Casmalia, rather than Someo, because of a name conflict with another California town and the name, Someo, was eventually dropped.

The new railroad town soon swelled to more than 1500 people in its early years. 100 years later, that population had shrunk to less than 200 because of the Casmalia Resources Hazardous Waste Landfill facility. During the heyday of the Casmalia Oil Field, the present town served as the red light district for the Union Oil Company workers who lived in the nearby Casmalia Hills.

 north of the town, this  hazardous waste landfill began operating in 1973 and accepted toxic chemicals like PCBs, motor oil, and pesticides. In 1989, the facility was closed down following a number of permit violations. In 1992, it was taken over by the federal Environmental Protection Agency, which began the process of cleaning up and administering the site.

The soil and groundwater at the site were significantly contaminated and the former dump became a Superfund site. During its operation, 5.6 billion pounds of hazardous waste from up to 10,000 individuals, businesses and government agencies were buried at the site.

The public area of the hotel built by Antonio Tognazzini and operated by Frank A. Vandoit more than 100 years ago still exists, although the guest rooms were torn down in 1944.  The building is now occupied by The Hitching Post barbecue restaurant, famous locally for their Santa Maria-style barbecue.

The superfund site still continues to be worked on over the hill, but the town has been able to return to reasonable normality.

Geography
According to the United States Census Bureau, the CDP covers an area of 0.2 square miles (0.5 km2), all of it land.

Climate
This region experiences warm (but not hot) and dry summers, with no average monthly temperatures above 71.6 °F.  According to the Köppen Climate Classification system, Casmalia has a warm-summer Mediterranean climate, abbreviated "Csb" on climate maps.

Demographics

The 2010 United States Census reported that Casmalia had a population of 138. The racial makeup of Casmalia was 91 (65.9%) White, 3 (2.2%) African American, 0 (0.0%) Native American, 1 (0.7%) Asian, 0 (0.0%) Pacific Islander, 30 (21.7%) from other races, and 13 (9.4%) from two or more races. Hispanic or Latino of any race were 58 persons (42.0%).

The Census reported that 138 people (100% of the population) lived in households, 0 (0%) lived in non-institutionalized group quarters, and 0 (0%) were institutionalized.

There were 57 households, out of which 16 (28.1%) had children under the age of 18 living in them, 20 (35.1%) were opposite-sex married couples living together, 8 (14.0%) had a female householder with no husband present, 4 (7.0%) had a male householder with no wife present.  There were 7 (12.3%) unmarried opposite-sex partnerships.  21 households (36.8%) were made up of individuals, and 12 (21.1%) had someone living alone who was 65 years of age or older. The average household size was 2.42.  There were 32 families (56.1% of all households); the average family size was 3.16.

The population was spread out, with 29 people (21.0%) under the age of 18, 11 people (8.0%) aged 18 to 24, 31 people (22.5%) aged 25 to 44, 47 people (34.1%) aged 45 to 64, and 20 people (14.5%) who were 65 years of age or older.  The median age was 43.0 years. For every 100 females, there were 102.9 males.  For every 100 females age 18 and over, there were 101.9 males.

The homeowner vacancy rate was 0%; the rental vacancy rate was 6.7%.  71 people (51.4% of the population) lived in owner-occupied housing units and 67 people (48.6%) lived in rental housing units.

References

Census-designated places in Santa Barbara County, California
Swiss-American history
Populated places established in the 1890s
Census-designated places in California